The centered icosahedral numbers and cuboctahedral numbers are two different names for the same sequence of numbers, describing two different representations for these numbers as three-dimensional figurate numbers. As centered icosahedral numbers, they are centered numbers representing points arranged in the shape of a regular icosahedron. As cuboctahedral numbers, they represent points arranged in the shape of a cuboctahedron, and are a magic number for the face-centered cubic lattice. The centered icosahedral number for a specific  is given by 

The first such numbers are

References
 .

Figurate numbers